Ranald "Ran" John McDonald (November 21, 1889 – January 29, 1950) was a Canadian professional ice hockey player who played 159 games in various professional and amateur leagues, including the Pacific Coast Hockey Association (PCHA). Among the teams he played with were the New Westminster Royals, Portland Rosebuds, Victoria Aristocrats, and Spokane Canaries.

He also played lacrosse with the Vancouver Lacrosse Club.

Playing career
Born in Cashion's Glen, Ontario, McDonald played for various senior teams in Fort William, Ontario, and Port Arthur, Ontario, before joining the new New Westminster Royals of the PCHA. He was named to the league's first all-star team in 1912, 1913, and 1914. McDonald played eight seasons in all in the PCHA before 1919. He played in the ill-fated 1919 Stanley Cup Finals, cancelled after five games due to the Spanish flu pandemic, and played one more season in 1920–21 with the Edmonton Dominions of the Big Four League before retiring.

Statistics

References

Notes

External links

1889 births
1950 deaths
Canadian ice hockey right wingers
Canadian lacrosse players
Ice hockey people from Ontario
New Westminster Royals players
Portland Rosebuds players
Seattle Metropolitans players
Spokane Canaries players
Vancouver Millionaires players
Victoria Aristocrats players